Dariapur is a  village in the Deshapran CD block in the Contai subdivision of the Purba Medinipur district in the state of West Bengal, India.

Geography

Location

Urbanisation
93.55% of the population of Contai subdivision live in the rural areas. Only 6.45% of the population live in the urban areas and it is considerably behind Haldia subdivision in urbanization, where 20.81% of the population live in urban areas.

Note: The map alongside presents some of the notable locations in the subdivision. All places marked in the map are linked in the larger full screen map.

Demographics
According to the 2011 Census of India, Dariapur had a total population of 1,375, of which 719 (52%) were males and 656 (48%) were females. There were 133 persons in the age range of 0–6 years. The total number of literate persons in Dariapur was 1,134 (91.30% of the population over 6 years).

Lighthouse
The range of visibility is 19 sea miles. The construction of the present RCC lighthouse tower was completed in 1964 and the PV equipment, consisting of a 230 V 70 W metal halide lamp and low maintenance batteries, was installed in 1999. It was erected in 1943 and dismantled in 1964. The PV equipment of the old tower was initially placed in the new tower and used till it was replaced by more effective equipment.

Kapalkundala temple
Bankim Chandra Chatterjee wrote his second novel Kapalkundala in 1866. it is a story of a forest-dwelling girl named Kapalkundala, who fell in love with and married a young man from the city, but eventually found that she was unable to adjust herself with city life. Following the success of Chatterjee’s first novel Durgeshnandini, he wrote Kapalkundala. The story is set in Dariapur, where Chatterjee served as a Deputy Magistrate and Deputy Collector.

Kapalkundala temple has been declared a heritage site by the West Bengal Heritage Commission.

Dariapur picture gallery

References

External links

Villages in Purba Medinipur district